Hygrophoropsis coacta is a species of fungus in the family Hygrophoropsidaceae. Described as new to science in 1969 by Robert Francis Ross McNabb, it is found in New Zealand.

References

External links

Hygrophoropsidaceae
Fungi described in 1969
Fungi of New Zealand